The  was a Japanese clan that ruled over the Japanese before the Edo period.

Unity and conflict
The most influential figure within the Toyotomi was Toyotomi Hideyoshi, one of the three "unifiers of Japan". Oda Nobunaga was another primary unifier and the ruler of the Oda clan at the time. Hideyoshi joined Nobunaga at a young age, but was not highly regarded because of his peasant background. Nevertheless, Hideyoshi's increasing influence allowed him to seize a significant degree of power from the Oda clan following Oda Nobunaga's death in 1582. As the virtual ruler of most of Japan, Hideyoshi received the new clan name "Toyotomi" in 1585 from the emperor, and achieved the unification of Japan in 1590.

When Hideyoshi died in 1598, his son Toyotomi Hideyori was only five years old. Five regents were appointed to rule until his maturity, and conflicts among them began quickly. In 1600, Tokugawa Ieyasu deposed Hideyori and took power after winning the Battle of Sekigahara. In 1614, Hideyori came into conflict with the Tokugawa clan, leading to Tokugawa Ieyasu's Siege of Osaka from 1614 to 1615. As a result of the siege, Hideyori and his mother, Yodo-dono, committed seppuku in the flames of Osaka castle. A rumor said that Toyotomi Hideyori's son Toyotomi Kunimatsu escaped execution, and another rumor said that Hideyori had an illegitimate son named Amakusa Shirō.

Other notables
 Ōmandokoro
 Toyotomi Hidetsugu
 Toyotomi Hidenaga
 Yodo-dono
 Nene
 Hashiba Hidekatsu
 Toyotomi Sadako
 Tomo (Toyotomi)

Notes

Bibliography
 Berry, Mary Elizabeth. (1982). Hideyoshi. Cambridge: Harvard UP, ; 
 Seiichi Iwao, Teizō Iyanaga, 2002: Dictionnaire historique du Japon, vol. 1, p. 1145. Maisonneuve & Larose 
 Chris Spackman, 2009: An Encyclopedia of Japanese History , p. 387. BiblioBazaar, LLC
 William Scott Wilson, 2004: The lone samurai: the life of Miyamoto Musashi, p. 32. Kodansha International
 George Sansom, 1961: A history of Japan', vol. 2 (1334-1615). Stanford University Press
 Eiji Yoshikawa, 1993: Taiko''. A. Knaus Verlag: München.

External links
 Samurai-archives.com: Toyotomi clan

 
Toyotomi clan